Sona Poghosyan (born 29 June 1998) is an Armenian weightlifter. She competed in the women's 75 kg event at the 2016 Summer Olympics. In 2018, she tested positive for GHRP-2-metabolite (AA1-3) and was banned until 2022 by the International Weightlifting Federation.

References

External links
 

1998 births
Living people
Armenian female weightlifters
Olympic weightlifters of Armenia
Weightlifters at the 2016 Summer Olympics
Place of birth missing (living people)
Weightlifters at the 2014 Summer Youth Olympics
European Weightlifting Championships medalists
21st-century Armenian women